St. Hedwig refers to Hedwig of Silesia (1174–1243), Catholic saint and Duchess of Silesia and of Greater Poland. 

St. Hedwig or St. Hedwig's may also refer to:


Roman Catholic parishes in the United States
 St. Hedwig Parish, Union City, Connecticut
 St. Hedwig Parish, Cambridge, Massachusetts
 St. Hedwig Parish, Southbridge, Massachusetts
 St. Hedwig's (Milwaukee), Wisconsin

Cathedrals and churches
 St. Hedwig's Cathedral, Berlin
 St. Hedwig's Church (Chicago), Illinois, United States

Other uses
 Jadwiga of Poland (1373 or 1374–1399), also spelled Hedwig, first queen of Poland and saint
 St. Hedwig, Texas, United States, a town
 St. Hedwig Cemetery (disambiguation)

See also
 St. Hedwig of Silesia Church, Radoszowy, Poland